Penicillium elleniae is a species of the genus of Penicillium which was isolated from the Colombian Amazon forest.

See also
 List of Penicillium species

References

elleniae
Fungi described in 2011